Bogue Chitto  is an unincorporated community in Dallas County, Alabama.  It was named for the nearby creek of the same name, which in the Choctaw language means "big stream."

History
In the early 1900s the population consisted of black landowners whose ancestors had been enslaved on the cotton-producing plantations and had bought land there after the American Civil War ended. Almost every man was registered to vote, and did vote, from Reconstruction until their rights were taken away. A spirit of independence, caused by landownership, prevented even the Ku Klux Klan from infringing upon their rights: "Local lore had it that the Klan came calling one night, looking for a Bogue Chitto man who had refused to doff his hat to a white man and say 'Yessir'. They were met by a spray of bullets and did not come back".

Inoculations against typhoid in 1930 were administered to over 900 people in Bogue Chitto, and Amelia Platts, a "black home demonstration agent" ("community clubs" had been opened throughout Dallas County to help improve the lives of African-American farmers and their families) who attended the county nurse during the process, noted an active community spirit. A decade later it was one of the first places to welcome voter registration classes. Later still, the Student Nonviolent Coordinating Committee got four volunteers from Bogue Chitto, and a minister from a church just south of the community, to help with voter registration efforts in the area.

Geography

Notable inhabitants
Redoshi, a woman originally from Benin, West-Africa, kidnapped and sold to a Dallas County slave owner.
Amelia Boynton Robinson, Civil Rights activist, based on Bogue Chitto

References

Alabama placenames of Native American origin
Unincorporated communities in Alabama
Unincorporated communities in Dallas County, Alabama